Gufran-Ullah Beig (born 24 May 1961) is an Indian meteorologist and a scientist at the Indian Institute of Tropical Meteorology, Pune. He is the programme director of System of Air Quality Forecasting and Research (SAFAR), a network of air quality and weather monitoring stations, which assists in the forecast of air quality and in maintaining an emission inventory. An elected fellow of the Indian Academy of Sciences, he received the Norbert Gerbier-Mumm International Award of the World Meteorological Organization in 2005, the first Indian to receive the honor. The Council of Scientific and Industrial Research, the apex agency of the Government of India for scientific research, awarded him the Shanti Swarup Bhatnagar Prize for Science and Technology, one of the highest Indian science awards for his contributions to Earth, Atmosphere, Ocean and Planetary Sciences in 2006.

Biography 
Beig, born on 24 May 1961 in Jhalawar, Rajasthan, he completed his graduate studies in science from Rajasthan University in 1980 and obtained a master's degree in physics from Mohanlal Sukhadia University in 1983. Subsequently, he enrolled for doctoral studies at Physical Research Laboratory and after securing a PhD in atmospheric physics in 1990, he did his post-doctoral studies at National Center for Atmospheric Research. On his return to India, he joined Mohanlal Sukhadia University as an assistant professor in 1994 and after a service of two years, he moved to National Physical Laboratory of India in February 1994 as a scientist (B-Grade). His stay at NPL lasted only 5 months and in July 1996, he joined (IITM) as a scientist (Grade-C). Over the years, he rose through ranks to hold the position of a scientist (Grade-G) and also heads the System of Air Quality Forecasting and Research (SAFAR) programme as its director. He is known for his studies on anthropogenic emissions of green house gases and his studies have been documented in several peer-reviewed articles.

Awards and honors 
The World Meteorological Organization selected him for the Norbert Gerbier-Mumm International Award in 2005, making him the first Indian recipient of the honor. The Council of Scientific and Industrial Research awarded him the Shanti Swarup Bhatnagar Prize, one of the highest Indian science awards in 2006 and three years later, the Indian Academy of Sciences elected him as their fellow. He is also a recipient of the Young Muslim Scientist Award in physical sciences (1999) and the Maharana Udai Singh Award (2007).

Selected bibliography

See also 
 Greenhouse effect
 Air quality index

Notes

References

External links

Further reading 
 

Recipients of the Shanti Swarup Bhatnagar Award in Earth, Atmosphere, Ocean & Planetary Sciences
1961 births
Indian scientific authors
Indian geologists
Fellows of the Indian Academy of Sciences
Indian meteorologists
Scientists from Pune
University of Rajasthan alumni
Mohanlal Sukhadia University alumni
Academic staff of Mohanlal Sukhadia University
Living people
20th-century Indian earth scientists